A savings bank is a financial institution whose primary purpose is accepting savings deposits and paying interest on those deposits.

They originated in Europe during the 18th century with the aim of providing access to savings products to all levels in the population.  Often associated with social good, these early banks were often designed to encourage low-income people to save money and have access to banking services.  They were set up by governments or by socially committed groups or organisations such as with credit unions. The structure and legislation took many different forms in different countries over the 20th century.

Savings banks and savings-and-loans are often confused. The original function of savings banks to service consumers was limited to savings. Savings banks invested in government and corporate debt. Savings and loan associations had a dual purpose which gave more importance to home loans. Towards the end of the 20th century their functions blurred as savings banks issued mortgages.

The advent of Internet banking at the end of the 20th century saw a new phase in savings banks with the online savings bank that paid higher levels of interest in return for clients only having access over the web.

History
In Europe, savings banks originated in the 19th or sometimes even the 18th century. Their original objective was to provide easily accessible savings products to all strata of the population.  In some countries, savings banks were created on public initiative, while in others, socially committed individuals created foundations to put in place the necessary infrastructure.

In 1914, the New Student's Reference Work said of the origins:

By country
Nowadays, European savings banks have kept their focus on retail banking: payments, savings products, credits and insurances for individuals or small and medium-sized enterprises. Apart from this retail focus, they also differ from commercial banks  by their broadly decentralised distribution network, providing local and regional outreach.

 Austria: see Erste Group
 Brazil: see Caixa Econômica Federal
 Bulgaria: see DSK Bank
 Czechoslovakia: see Economy of Communist Czechoslovakia
 France: see Groupe Caisse d'Épargne
 Germany: see Sparkassen-Finanzgruppe
 Italy: see Cassa di Risparmio
 New Zealand: Savings banks ceased to exist in 1987 as an official type of bank, being replaced with registered banks (Grimes, 1998)
 Norway: see Sparebank
 Portugal: see Caixa Geral de Depósitos
 Soviet Union: see sberkassa (сберкасса, сберегательная касса), often translated as “savings bank” even though sberkassas were not banks in the common sense. Initially they were the outlets of the only Soviet State Bank, Gosbank until 1987 and Sberbank (USSR Savings Bank) afterwards.
 Spain: see Savings bank (Spain)
 Sweden: see List of banks in Sweden#Savings banks
 United Kingdom: see Trustee savings bank
 United States: see Savings and loan association, Federal savings bank, and Mutual savings bank

See also

 Postal savings system

References

Bibliography
 "Liberalisation of financial markets in New Zealand" Arthur Grimes, Institute of Policy Studies, Victoria University of Wellington, Wellington, 1998   Retrieved Feb. 11, 2006.
 Tiwari, Rajnish and Buse, Stephan (2006): The German Banking Sector: Competition, Consolidation and Contentment, Hamburg University of Technology (TU Hamburg-Harburg)
 Brunner, A., Decressin, J. / Hardy, D. / Kudela, B. (2004): Germany’s Three-Pillar Banking System – Cross-Country Perspectives in Europe, Occasional Paper, International Monetary Fund, Washington, D.C. 2004.
 Mauri, Arnaldo (1969). The Promotion of Thrift and of Savings Banks in Developing Countries, International Savings Bank Institute, Geneva.

External links

 World Savings and Retail Banking Institute / European Savings and Retail Banking Group
 Crisis y Reforma de las Cajas de Ahorros en España

Banks